Henley is a suburb on the Lower North Shore of Sydney, in the state of New South Wales, Australia. Henley is located 9 kilometres west of the Sydney central business district, in the local government area of the Municipality of Hunter's Hill. Henley sits on the northern side of the Parramatta River.

History

Aboriginal 
Prior to the arrival of European settlers, the area was inhabited by the Wallumettagal people of the Eora nation.

European settlement
Henley was originally known as Blandville.  It was named after Dr William Bland, a convict who was transported for killing a fellow naval officer in a duel. Bland arrived in 1814, but was pardoned in 1815 and began a private practice. Bland resided in the city but owned the land which he subdivided in 1866.

The suburb's name is derived from its namesake Henley, a town located on the banks of the River Thames in Oxfordshire, England. Parramatta River had been known as the 'Thames of the Antipodes', and other nearby suburbs were also named after Thames localities including Greenwich, Woolwich and Putney.

Population
In the 2016 Census, there were 469 people in Henley. 70.1% of people were born in Australia and 66.6% of people spoke only English at home. The most common responses for religion were Catholic (29.4%) and No Religion (25.6%).

Transport 
Henley is serviced by bus services along the main thoroughfare of Victoria Road, which link the suburb with Sydney's CBD, as well as West Ryde and Parramatta.

The nearby Huntley's Point ferry wharf also connects residents to Parramatta River ferry services.

References

The Book of Sydney Suburbs, Compiled by Frances Pollen, Angus & Robertson Publishers, 1990, Published in Australia

External links
Discover Hunters Hill

Suburbs of Sydney
Municipality of Hunter's Hill